Munday Consolidated Independent School District (MCISD) is a public school district based in Munday, Texas (USA).  In addition to Munday, the district also serves the city of Goree. Located primarily in southeastern Knox County, small portions of the district extend into northeastern Haskell and northwestern Throckmorton counties.

In 2010, the school district was rated "Recognized" by the Texas Education Agency.

History

On July 1, 2003, the Munday Independent School District consolidated with the Goree Independent School District and adopted its current name.

Schools
Munday Secondary School (Grades 7-12)
Munday Elementary School (Grades PK-6)

References

External links
 
 

School districts in Knox County, Texas
School districts in Haskell County, Texas
School districts in Throckmorton County, Texas